Martin Perna is an educator, and multidisciplinary artist living in Houston, Texas.

Music
Perna, who is of Mexican American descent, founded the musical groups Antibalas and Ocote Soul Sounds, and has written for and/or recorded with Sharon Jones, Scarlett Johansson, Baaba Maal, Angelique Kidjo, David Byrne, the Whitefield Brothers, the Daktaris, No Surrender, Apsci, Architecture in Helsinki, and many other groups.

Education
Perna began his educational work in 1992 at the Franklin Institute in Philadelphia as an overnight docent during the Camp-In Program. From 1998-2000, he taught at El Puente Academy for Peace and Justice in Brooklyn, New York. He has integrated education into his work as a musician, conducting musical workshops at Yale, McGill, Haverford, New York University, Concordia, University of Texas-Austin, and University of St. Denis (Île Réunion).

Multidisciplinary Art
He is author of the children's book BLACKOUT! about the 2003 blackout in the Northeastern United States and Canada, published in 2006 by Magic Propaganda Mill and illustrated by Ricardo Cortes.

An apprentice of earth architecture master Nader Khalili Perna also practices superadobe architecture and has created works in Michoacán, Mexico, and Austin, Texas.

Partial Discography
The Very Best "untitled" Flute, baritone saxophone 
Daktaris "Soul Explosion" Flute, tenor saxophone.
Mike Jackson and the Soul Providers "Revenge of Mr. Mopoji"
Nino Nardini "Rotonde Musique" Flute, saxophone 
Lee Fields "Let's Get a Groove On" Baritone saxophone 
Sharon Jones and the Dap Kings "Dap Dippin'" Baritone saxophone 
Antibalas "Liberation Afrobeat Vol. 1" Baritone saxophone, percussion 
Antibalas "Talkatif" Baritone saxophone 
Antibalas "Who Is This America" Baritone saxophone
Antibalas "Government Magic" Baritone saxophone
Antibalas "Security" Baritone Sax
Antibalas "Antibalas" Baritone Sax
TV on the Radio "Satellite" Flutes
TV on the Radio "Desperate Youth, Bloodthirsty Babes" Flutes, saxophones
TV on the Radio "Return to Cookie Mountain" Flute, saxophones, percussion
TV on the Radio "Dear Science," Flutes, saxophones
Ocote Soul Sounds "El Niño y El Sol" Flutes, saxophones, guitars, percussion
Ocote Soul Sounds "The Alchemist Manifesto" Vocals, flutes, saxophones, guitars, percussion
Ocote Soul Sounds "Coconut Rock" Vocals, flutes, saxophones, guitars, percussion
Ocote Soul Sounds "Taurus" Vocals, flutes, saxophones, guitars, percussion
Elvis Costello and The Roots "Walk Us Uptown" Chico Mann Antibalas rework. Saxophones
DJ Sun "Heart Seed featuring Leah Alvarez and Martin Perna", flute

References

External links
  Ocote Soul Sounds
 Personal site
 Antibalas
 Martin sits down with Ira Haberman of The Sound Podcast for a feature interview

1975 births
Musicians from Philadelphia
Living people
American musicians of Mexican descent
Hispanic and Latino American musicians
Antibalas members